Raymond Mark Stachowicz (born March 6, 1959) is a former American football punter in the National Football League (NFL). Stachowicz was drafted in the third round by the Green Bay Packers out of Michigan State University in the 1981 NFL Draft.

Personal life
Stachowicz is of Polish descent.

College football awards
4× First-team All-Big Ten   
2× First-team All-American 
Only Player until then to be All-Big Ten all four years

References

External links
 NFL.com player page

1959 births
Living people
American football punters
Chicago Bears players
Green Bay Packers players
Michigan State Spartans football players
Players of American football from Cleveland
American people of Polish descent